Mathieu Grébille (born 6 October 1991) is a French handball player for Paris Saint-Germain and the French national team.

He participated at the 2019 World Men's Handball Championship.

References

External links

Handball players from Paris
French male handball players
Olympic handball players of France
Handball players at the 2016 Summer Olympics
Medalists at the 2016 Summer Olympics
Olympic silver medalists for France
Olympic medalists in handball
Montpellier Handball players
1991 births
Living people
French people of Martiniquais descent
21st-century French people